Tony Kgoroge (born 21 April 1974) is a South African actor. He is best known for his performance as Jason Tshabalala in Invictus.

He also stars as Zimele "Ngcolosi" Bhengu on e.tv's soap, Imbewu: The Seed.

Personal life
He is married to actressSthandiwe Kgoroge and they have children. When faced with debt recovery in 2018, he asked that people ignore his and his wife's Instagram pages. They were only "ordinary people". He was facing loss of earnings because he was not being paid for repeat fees by some broadcasters.

Selected filmography

References

External links

Tony Kgoroge on TVSA

Living people
South African male film actors
1974 births